Cheleh Gah (also Romanized as Cheleh Gāh and Chelleh Gah) is a village in Rig Rural District, in the Central District of Lordegan County, Chaharmahal and Bakhtiari Province, Iran. At the 2006 census, its population was 1,228, in 210 families.

References 

Populated places in Lordegan County